Xerocrassa amphiconus is a species of air-breathing land snail, a pulmonate gastropod mollusk in the family Geomitridae.

Distribution

This species is endemic to Greece, where it is restricted to the easternmost mountain range of Crete. As adults, these snails can grow to a size of 4–6 x 9–12 mm.

See also
List of non-marine molluscs of Greece

References

 Bank, R. A.; Neubert, E. (2017). Checklist of the land and freshwater Gastropoda of Europe. Last update: July 16th, 2017

External links

 Maltzan, H. von. (1883). Diagnosen neuer kretischer Helices. Nachrichtsblatt der deutschen malakozoologischen Gesellschaft. 15: 102-106. Frankfurt am Main
 Hausdorf, B.; Sauer, J. (2009). Revision of the Helicellinae of Crete (Gastropoda: Hygromiidae). Zoological Journal of the Linnean Society. 157(2): 373-419

amphiconus
Molluscs of Europe
Endemic fauna of Crete
Gastropods described in 1883